Dendrolaelaps crenatus is a species of mite in the family Digamasellidae. It was first described by Malcolm Luxton in 1984.

References

Digamasellidae
Articles created by Qbugbot
Animals described in 1984